William B. Saunders (September 23, 1896 – August 14, 1977) was an American football, basketball, and baseball coach and college athletics administrator. He played college football at Mississippi Agricultural & Mechanical College—now known as Mississippi State University—and is also said to have played at Auburn University and the Georgia Institute of Technology. Saunders served as the head football coach (1928–1929), head basketball coach (1928–1930) and head baseball coach (1929–1930) at Mississippi State Teachers College—now known as the University of Southern Mississippi.

Saunders was a native of Greenville, Mississippi.  He died at the age of 80, on August 14, 1977, at Mississippi Baptist Medical Center in Jackson, Mississippi.

Head coaching record

College football

References

External links
 

1896 births
1977 deaths
Auburn Tigers football players
Basketball coaches from Mississippi
Georgia Tech Yellow Jackets football players
Mississippi State Bulldogs football players
Southern Miss Golden Eagles basketball coaches
Southern Miss Golden Eagles baseball coaches
Southern Miss Golden Eagles and Lady Eagles athletic directors
High school football coaches in Mississippi
Sportspeople from Greenville, Mississippi
Players of American football from Mississippi